Legislative Council elections were held in Burma in November 1928. Despite expectations that pro-government candidates would win, the result was a victory for the opposition, which won 45 of the 80 elected seats. However, the People's Party, the largest opposition party, was unable to form a government. Instead, the pro-British Independent Party formed the government.

Electoral system
The Legislative Council had 80 elected members, who were elected in 72 constituencies. Around 55% of the adult population of the country was eligible to vote in the elections. Women remained barred from standing as candidates, provoking a public protest by women at the Secretariat.

Results
Opposition parties won 45 seats, with the People's Party receiving the most votes. Sixteen independents were elected, of whom nine were thought to be pro-opposition. The pro-government parties and independents lost eight seats.

Voter turnout was only 18%.

References

Burma
Elections in Myanmar
1928 in Burma
Burmese
Election and referendum articles with incomplete results